Eric Joel Andersson (born 11 November 1996) is a Swedish professional footballer who plays for Danish Superliga club Midtjylland as a right-back.

Club career
A native of Gothenburg, Andersson started playing football with Västra Frölunda IF. At the age of 15, he also made some appearances for the first team, who at the time were competing in the fourth-tier Division 2.

In 2013, Andersson moved to BK Häcken, another team in the Gothenburg area, but the first two years he spent in the youth academy. He was promoted to the first team in 2015 alongside his brother, Adam Andersson, and began making regular appearances in Allsvenskan. Joel and Adam, however, were not the only twins appearing for the team, given the presence of the two Gustafson's, Samuel and Simon. From the 2016 season, Joel Andersson established himself permanently as the starting right-back in the team.

On 2 July 2018, Andersson signed a five-year contract with Danish Superliga club Midtjylland.

International career
Andersson made his debut for Sweden national team on 7 January 2018 in a friendly against Estonia.

Career statistics

Club

International

Honours
BK Häcken
Svenska Cupen: 2015–16

Midtjylland
 Danish Superliga: 2019–20
 Danish Cup: 2018–19

References

External links
 
 
 Joel Andersson at fcm.dk
 

1996 births
Living people
Footballers from Gothenburg
Association football midfielders
Swedish footballers
Swedish expatriate footballers
Sweden youth international footballers
Sweden under-21 international footballers
Sweden international footballers
Allsvenskan players
Danish Superliga players
Västra Frölunda IF players
BK Häcken players
FC Midtjylland players
Expatriate men's footballers in Denmark
Swedish expatriate sportspeople in Denmark